This article presents a list of the historical events and publications of Australian literature during 1914.

Books 

 Mary Grant Bruce — Gray's Hollow
 Ada Cambridge — The Making of Rachel Rowe
 Edward Dyson
 Loves of Lancelot
 Spat's Fact'ry: More Fact'ry 'Ands
 Mabel Forrest — A Bachelor's Wife
 Louise Mack — The House of Daffodils
 Dorothea Mackellar & Ruth M. Bedford — Two's Company
 Will H. Ogilvie — The Honour of the Station
 Ambrose Pratt
 Her Assigned Husband
 War in the Pacific
 Lilian Turner — The Girl from the Backblocks
 E. L. Grant Watson — Where Bonds are Loosed

Poetry 

 Emily Coungeau — Stella Australis: Poems and Verses and Prose Fragments
 James Lister Cuthbertson — "The Bush"
 C. J. Dennis
 "Mar"
 "The Sentimental Bloke: The Play"
 Mabel Forrest — "The Heroes"
 Henry Lawson 
 "Dawgs of War"
 "A Fantasy of War"
 Will Lawson — The Three Kings and Other Verses
 Dorothy Francis McCrae — Solder, My Soldier!
 Hugh McCrae — "June Morning"
 Dorothea Mackellar — The Witch-Maid and Other Verses
 John Shaw Neilson 
 "The Eyes of Little Charlotte"
 Green Days and Cherries: the early verses of Shaw Neilson
 "O Lady of the Dazzling Flowers"
 Nettie Palmer — The South Wind
 A. B. Paterson 
 "The Road to Hogan's Gap"
 "Song of the Wheat"
 "Sunrise on the Coast"

Births 

A list, ordered by date of birth (and, if the date is either unspecified or repeated, ordered alphabetically by surname) of births in 1914 of Australian literary figures, authors of written works or literature-related individuals follows, including year of death.

 6 February — Donald Friend, artist and diarist (died 1989)
 23 February – Pat Flower, playwright, television scriptwriter and crime novelist (died 1977)
 4 November — Peter Cowan, novelist (died 2002)
 1 December — David McNicoll, poet (died 2000)
 23 December — Clement Semmler, critic (died 2000)

Deaths 

A list, ordered by date of death (and, if the date is either unspecified or repeated, ordered alphabetically by surname) of deaths in 1914 of Australian literary figures, authors of written works or literature-related individuals follows, including year of birth.

 13 January — John Philip Bourke, poet (born 1860)

See also 
 1914 in poetry
 List of years in literature
 List of years in Australian literature
 1914 in literature
 1913 in Australian literature
 1914 in Australia
 1915 in Australian literature

References

Literature
Australian literature by year
20th-century Australian literature